Eugène Lenormand (9 October 1891 – 9 January 1974) was a French diver. He competed at the 1924 Summer Olympics and the 1928 Summer Olympics.

References

External links
 

1891 births
1974 deaths
French male divers
Olympic divers of France
Divers at the 1924 Summer Olympics
Divers at the 1928 Summer Olympics
Place of birth missing
20th-century French people